Roe Street bus station was a Transperth bus station located on Roe Street, next to Perth station in Western Australia which operated between 12 January 2014 and 17 July 2016.

History
Roe Street bus station opened on 12 January 2014, as a temporary replacement for the closed Wellington Street bus station. Most services transferred to this station, while others were transferred to Esplanade Busport. A second temporary bus station was also constructed on Wellington Street to handle displaced services. It had 12 stands and was used by 25 Transperth routes. It closed on 17 July 2016 when Perth Busport began operating.

References

Bus stations in Perth, Western Australia
Perth City Link
Former bus stations
Transport infrastructure completed in 2014
2014 establishments in Australia
2016 disestablishments in Australia